The 1994 Georgia Bulldogs football team represented the University of Georgia during the 1994 NCAA Division I-A football season. The Bulldogs completed the season with a 6–4–1 record.

Schedule

Roster

References

Georgia
Georgia Bulldogs football seasons
Georgia Bulldogs football